The 2017–18 AC Sparta Prague season was the club's 123rd season in existence and the 25th consecutive season in the top flight of Czech football. In addition to the domestic league, AC Sparta Prague participated in this season's editions of the Czech Cup and the UEFA Europa League. The season covered the period from 1 July 2017 to 30 June 2018.

Squad 
Squad at end of season

Out on loan

Competitions

Overview

Czech First League

League table

Results summary

Results by round

Matches

Czech Cup

UEFA Europa League

Qualifying rounds

Third qualifying round

References 

AC Sparta Prague seasons
Sparta Prague
Sparta Prague